Elections to the Baseball Hall of Fame for 1971 featured a new committee on the Negro leagues that met in February and selected Satchel Paige, who spent most of his career in Negro league baseball before joining the Cleveland Indians in 1948, when he was over 40 years old. Controversy arose both over the selection of a pitcher with only 28 major-league victories (Negro league baseball statistics were not considered major-league statistics until 2020) and about the original plan not to include Negro league players in the main Hall of Fame. In July, officials announced that Paige and future Negro league selections would be included in the main Hall of Fame. Paige was honored alongside other Hall of Fame inductees in August.

Otherwise, the elections continued a system of annual elections in place since 1968. The Baseball Writers' Association of America (BBWAA) voted by mail to select from recent major league players and elected no one. The Veterans Committee met in closed-door sessions to select from executives, managers, umpires, and earlier major league players. It elected seven, the most in its 1953 to 2001 history: Dave Bancroft, Jake Beckley, Chick Hafey, Harry Hooper, Joe Kelley, Rube Marquard, and George Weiss.  A formal induction ceremony was held in Cooperstown, New York, on August 9, 1971, with Commissioner of Baseball Bowie Kuhn presiding.

BBWAA election
The BBWAA was authorized to elect players active in 1951 or later, but not after 1965; the ballot included candidates from the 1970 ballot who received at least 5% of the vote but were not elected, along with selected players, chosen by a screening committee, whose last appearance was in 1965. All 10-year members of the BBWAA were eligible to vote.

Voters were instructed to cast votes for up to 10 candidates; any candidate receiving votes on at least 75% of the ballots would be honored with induction to the Hall. The ballot consisted of 48 players; a total of 360 ballots were cast, with 270 votes required for election. A total of 2,681 individual votes were cast, an average of 7.45 per ballot. Those candidates receiving less than 5% of the vote will not appear on future BBWAA ballots but may eventually be considered by the Veterans Committee.

Candidates who were eligible for the first time are indicated here with a dagger (†). Candidates who have since been elected in subsequent elections are indicated in italics.

Johnny Vander Meer and Bobby Doerr were on the ballot for the final time.

The field of newly eligible players included 13 All Stars, 7 of whom were not included on the ballot, representing a total of 70 All Star selections. The new class included 18-time All-Star Yogi Berra, 15-time All-Star Nellie Fox, 6-time All-Star Vic Power, and 5-time All-Stars Dick Donovan and Roy Sievers.

Players eligible for the first time who were not included on the ballot were: Frank Baumann, Gino Cimoli, Dick Donovan, Ryne Duren, Gordon Jones, Frank Lary, Don Mossi, Gus Triandos and Don Zimmer.

J. G. Taylor Spink Award 
Heywood Broun (1888–1939) received the J. G. Taylor Spink Award honoring a baseball writer. The award was voted at the December 1970 meeting of the BBWAA, and included in the summer 1971 ceremonies.

References

External links
1971 Election at www.baseballhalloffame.org

Baseball Hall of Fame balloting
Hall of Fame balloting
Negro league baseball
1971 in American sports